Miles Macdonell Collegiate is a high school in Winnipeg, Manitoba that opened in September 1952 and is part of the River East Transcona School Division. It is one of the six schools in Manitoba that participate in the International Baccalaureate Program. The school offers classes in French Immersion geared towards university attendance in either official language. Miles Macdonell also offers several vocational tracks of study.  Students may also complete a dual diploma, earning both an academic high school diploma and technical/vocational certification.

The school is named after Miles Macdonell who, as the first governor of the Red River Settlement, led the Red River Settlers in 1812 and reported directly to Lord Selkirk, founder of the settlement.  He is commemorated with a plaque that can be found just inside the front doors on Roch Avenue.

Music Program 

Several albums have been produced in the school, mainly consisting of the school's choir program and their prestigious vocal group called "Prodigy", consisting of a small number of talented singers. Prodigy has performed in various countries, including Scotland, Austria, Mexico, and the United States. When Queen Elizabeth II came to Winnipeg in 2003, Prodigy was asked to perform for her, as well as performing at the International Peace Gardens for the 5th anniversary of 9/11.

Festival Théâtre Jeunesse 

On May 8, 2008, a group of students from the French Immersion program participated in the annual Festival Théâtre Jeunesse at the Centre Culturel Franco-Manitobain (Franco-Manitoban Cultural Centre). The group performed a piece titled "Le long voyage" (The Long Voyage), which won the top prize in the General Production category.

Miles Macdonell Collegiate was originally two separate schools and therefore occupies two main buildings. The north wing was originally Melrose Junior High which existed from 1954 to 1962. These buildings are linked by a hallway which, although it is above ground, is referred to as "The Tunnel". It was built in 1970 replacing a smaller 10 foot wide tunnel built in 1964. The Tunnel not only connects the two buildings, but is also home to the library and the theatre, previously connecting to the arts room as well.
The original part of school, the present science wing, was built in 1952. It was followed by a 1955 addition, the south wing second floor, and a 1960 addition which added a gym and the school east of the tunnel. The former Melrose Junior High building became part of the school in 1962 and the current theatre, library and tunnel were added in 1970. In the 2010-2011 school year, two elevators were added to allow wheelchair access to the north and middle section second floors. In 2020 a new very large gym opened replacing the former Gyms A and B which were converted to other uses.

Alumni Association 

The Alumni Association of the collegiate began coalescing in 1997 in preparation for a 50th anniversary reunion in 2002, and was officially incorporated as the “Miles Macdonell Collegiate Alumni Association” in 2003.

In 2002, a group of alumni created a trust fund which has raised over $88,000 for the collegiate as of February 2019..

References

 "When The Work's All Done This Fall", McIntosh, 1989, p. 217

External links
Miles Macdonell Website
River East Transcona School Division
Manitoba Education
Miles MacDonell Collegiate Alumni Association
Miles Mac Buckeyes Girls Hockey Team

High schools in Winnipeg
International Baccalaureate schools in Manitoba
Educational institutions established in 1952
1952 establishments in Manitoba